The Voigt profile (named after Woldemar Voigt) is a  probability distribution given by a convolution of a Cauchy-Lorentz distribution and a Gaussian distribution. It is often used in analyzing data from spectroscopy or diffraction.

Definition
Without loss of generality, we can consider only centered profiles, which peak at zero. The Voigt profile is then 

where x is the shift from the line center,  is the centered Gaussian profile:

The defining integral can be evaluated as:

where Re[w(z)] is the real part of the Faddeeva function evaluated for

History and applications
In spectroscopy, a Voigt profile results from the convolution of two broadening mechanisms, one of which alone would produce a Gaussian profile (usually, as a result of the Doppler broadening), and the other would produce a Lorentzian profile. Voigt profiles are common in many branches of spectroscopy and diffraction. Due to the expense of computing the Faddeeva function, the Voigt profile is sometimes approximated using a pseudo-Voigt profile.

Properties
The Voigt profile is normalized:

since it is a convolution of normalized profiles. The Lorentzian profile has no moments (other than the zeroth), and so the moment-generating function for the Cauchy distribution is not defined. It follows that the Voigt profile will not have a moment-generating function either, but the characteristic function for the Cauchy distribution is well defined, as is the characteristic function for the normal distribution.  The characteristic function for the (centered) Voigt profile will then be the product of the two:

Since normal distributions and Cauchy distributions are stable distributions, they are each closed under convolution (up to change of scale), and it follows that the Voigt distributions are also closed under convolution.

Cumulative distribution function 
Using the above definition for z , the cumulative distribution function (CDF) can be found as follows:

Substituting the definition of the Faddeeva function (scaled complex error function) yields for the indefinite integral:

which may be solved to yield

where  is a hypergeometric function. In order for the function to approach zero as x approaches negative infinity (as the CDF must do), an integration constant of 1/2 must be added. This gives for the CDF of Voigt:

The uncentered Voigt profile 

The probability density function is simply offset from the centered profile by :

where:

Derivatives 

and

respectively.

Often, one or multiple Voigt profiles and/or their respective derivatives need to be fitted to a measured signal by means of Non-linear least squares, e.g., in spectroscopy. Then, further partial derivatives can be utilised to accelerate computations.

 
 
 

for the original voigt profile ;

 
 
 

for the first order partial derivative ; and

 
 
 

for the second order partial derivative . Such a reuse of previous calculations allows for a derivation at minimum costs.

Voigt functions
The Voigt functions U, V, and H (sometimes called the line broadening function) are defined by
 

where 

erfc is the complementary error function, and w(z) is the Faddeeva function.

Relation to Voigt profile 

with

and

Numeric approximations

Tepper-García Function 
The Tepper-García function, named after German-Mexican Astrophysicist Thor Tepper-García, is a combination of an exponential function and rational functions that approximates the line broadening function  over a wide range of its parameters.
It is obtained from a truncated power series expansion of the exact line broadening function.

In its most computationally efficient form, the Tepper-García function can be expressed as

Thus the line broadening function can be viewed, to first order, as a pure Gaussian function plus a correction factor that depends linearly on the microscopic properties of the absorbing medium (encoded in ); however, as a result of the early truncation in the series expansion, the error in the approximation is still of order , i.e. . This approximation has a relative accuracy of

In addition to its high accuracy, the function  is easy to implement as well as computationally fast. It is widely used in the field of quasar absorption line analysis.

Pseudo-Voigt approximation 
The pseudo-Voigt profile (or pseudo-Voigt function) is an approximation of the Voigt profile V(x) using a linear combination of a Gaussian curve G(x) and a Lorentzian curve L(x) instead of their convolution.

The pseudo-Voigt function is often used for calculations of experimental spectral line shapes.

The mathematical definition of the normalized pseudo-Voigt profile is given by
 is a function of full width at half maximum (FWHM) parameter.

There are several possible choices for the  parameter. A simple formula,  accurate to 1%, is

where now,  is a function of Lorentz, Gaussian and total Full width at half maximum (FWHM) parameters. The total FWHM parameter is described by:

The width of the Voigt profile 
The full width at half maximum (FWHM) of the Voigt profile can be found from the
widths of the associated Gaussian and Lorentzian widths. The FWHM of the Gaussian profile 
is

The FWHM of the Lorentzian profile is

An approximate relation (accurate to within about 1.2%) between the widths of the Voigt, Gaussian, and Lorentzian profiles is:

By construction, this expression is exact for a pure Gaussian or Lorentzian.

Again, this expression is exact for a pure Gaussian or Lorentzian.
In the same publication, a slightly more precise (within 0.012%), yet significantly more complicated expression can be found.

References

External links
 http://jugit.fz-juelich.de/mlz/libcerf, numeric C library for complex error functions, provides a function voigt(x, sigma, gamma) with approximately 13–14 digits precision.
The original article is : Voigt, Woldemar, 1912, ''Das Gesetz der Intensitätsverteilung innerhalb der Linien eines Gasspektrums'', Sitzungsbericht der Bayerischen Akademie der Wissenschaften, 25, 603 (see also: http://publikationen.badw.de/de/003395768)

Continuous distributions
Spectroscopy
Special functions
Probability distributions with non-finite variance